The 2022 Channel One Trophy was a Russian domestic team figure skating competition held from 25 to 27 March 2022 in Saransk. It was held simultaneously with the 2022 World Figure Skating Championships, from which Russian (and Belarusian) figure skaters were excluded.

On March 11, Figure Skating Federation of Russia published the competition format. As the framework of the competition, a jump festival and a team tournament are planned, where two teams would compete for prizes.  on 25 March, Anna Shcherbakova was the captain of the red team and Mark Kondratiuk was the captain of the blue team.

Entries

Teams 

Note: Ice dancers did not participate in the jumping festival.

Competition schedule
The competition was broadcast by Channel One Russia.

Listed in local time (UTC+03:00).

Results

Team

Men

Ladies

Pairs

Ice dance

Prize money 
On the first day, the red team that won the team jumping competition received a check for 3 million roubles, and the other team received a check for 2 million. Later, Mark Kondratiuk won the individual jumping competition, getting 500 thousand roubles.

On Sunday, the red team was handed a check for 10 million roubles for winning the cup, and the losing team was handed a check for 7.5 million roubles.

See also 
 2021 Channel One Trophy

References 

 2022 in figure skating
 2022 in Russian sport